Empire Byron was a  cargo ship which was built in 1941 for the Ministry of War Transport (MoWT). Completed in January 1942, she had a short service career. Empire Byron was torpedoed and sunk on 5 July 1942 by  while a member of Convoy PQ 17.

Description
Empire Byron was built by Bartram & Sons Ltd, Sunderland for the MoWT. She was yard number 289. Empire Byron was launched on 6 October 1941 and completed in January 1942.

The engine was built by North East Marine Engine Co (1938) Ltd, Newcastle upon Tyne. She had a GRT of 6,645 and a NRT of 4,796.

Career
Empire Byron was operated under the management of Haldin & Philipps Ltd. She was a member of a number of convoys during the Second World War.

PQ 12
Convoy PQ 12 departed Reykjavík, Iceland on 1 March 1942. It arrived at Murmansk on 12 March. Empire Byron was a member of this convoy.

QP 9
Convoy QP 9 departed the Kola Inlet, Soviet Union on 21 March 1942 and arrived at Reykjavík on 3 April. Empire Byron was listed as a member of this convoy, with a destination of Immingham.

PQ 17
Convoy PQ 17 departed Reykjavík on 27 June 1942 and scattered at sea on 5 July. Empire Byron had started her voyage from Hull. She was carrying a cargo of 15 aircraft, 30 tanks, 2,455 tons of military stores and six vehicles. A second passenger was taken prisoner. He was landed at Narvik, Norway on 15 July.

The ship's captain, John Wharton MBE, and the 3rd Radio Officer, R Phillips, were each awarded a Lloyd's War Medal for Bravery at Sea for their actions in the sinking of Empire Byron. In the case of Phillips, the award was posthumous. Those lost on Empire Byron are commemorated at the Tower Hill Memorial, London.

Official Numbers and Code Letters

Official Numbers were a forerunner to IMO Numbers. Empire Byron had the United Kingdom Official Number 169005 and used the Code Letters BCTG.

References

1941 ships
Ships built on the River Wear
Empire ships
Ministry of War Transport ships
Steamships of the United Kingdom
Ships sunk by German submarines in World War II
World War II shipwrecks in the Arctic Ocean
Maritime incidents in July 1942